Luv Is Rage is the debut commercial mixtape by American rapper Lil Uzi Vert. It was released on October 30, 2015, by Generation Now and Atlantic Records. The mixtape includes features from Young Thug and Wiz Khalifa. A sequel was released on August 25, 2017.

Background 
In a 2016 interview with GlobalGrindTV, Lil Uzi Vert explained the title of Luv Is Rage:It goes two different ways. It's, like, I usually just say the one way, but it go both ways. Like 'Luv Is Rage' is, like, L-U-V: it's Lil Uzi Vert, and, like, I'm a rockstar, I am rage, like everything I do, I'm raging. And, it's more, like, you know rage is, like, it's not that good, like, raging is, like, rebellious, like, and, like, with love, like, you know, love is good. Like, but love is also bad too. It's horrible. And it was, like, a lot of songs are a little darker and stuff and, like, you can hear the stuff that I say–stuff, like, yeah–I don't know, I'm always in a bad space, even if I'm, like–I don't know, I'm crazy.The version of the mixtape on streaming services only contains 12 of the 16 songs that are on the mixtape, as "Moist", "Queso", "Wit My Crew x 1987" and "Nuyork Nights at 21" are excluded.

The mixtape features Atlanta rapper Young Thug on streaming services. However, the mixtape also originally included a feature from fellow Pennsylvanian rapper Wiz Khalifa, whom Lil Uzi Vert considers to be one of their leading inspirations.

Release and promotion 
The music video for the mixtape's first track "Safe House" was released on November 10, 2015 as a WorldStarHipHop exclusive directed by Spike Jordan. As of July 2020, the music video has accumulated over 3 million views.

The music video for "Super Saiyan Trunks" was released on July 8, 2015. The music video features clips from Dragon Ball, a Japanese animated television series. As of July 2020, the music video has accumulated over 9 million views. In November 2020 Lil Uzi Vert teased Super Saiyan 2 on Twitter as well as playing a short clip featuring a similar beat, flow and intro as well as the similar opening line "Have you ever made 10 million dollars with your talent?" after revealing they will be revising older styles of their music on their next project.

The music video for "All My Chains" was released on February 19, 2016. The music video features Lil Uzi Vert in North Philadelphia, where they were born and raised. As of July 2020, the music video has accumulated over 6 million views.

Critical reception 
The mixtape received generally positive reviews. Darryl Robertson of Vibe called the project "solid". Rose Lilah of HotNewHipHop called the features on the mixtape "quality". Kemet High of XXL said that the mixtape "depicts Uzi at [their] rawest state", and said that the project was "packed with swift melodies".

Commercial performance 
"7AM" spent a total of ten weeks on the Bubbling Under R&B/Hip-Hop Singles chart, peaking at number five on August 6, 2016.

Track listing

Notes
 "Moist", "Queso", "Wit My Crew x 1987" and "Nuyork Nights at 21" are not available on streaming services.

Release history

References

Albums produced by Don Cannon
Albums produced by WondaGurl
Albums produced by Metro Boomin
Albums produced by Cubeatz
Atlantic Records albums
Lil Uzi Vert albums
2015 mixtape albums